NGC 435 is an intermediate spiral galaxy of type SAB(s)d: located in the constellation Cetus. It was discovered on October 23, 1864 by Albert Marth. It was described by Dreyer as "extremely faint, small, extended."

References

External links
 

0435
18641023
Cetus (constellation)
Intermediate spiral galaxies
004434